Pedro Portocarrero (died 1600) was a Roman Catholic prelate who served as Bishop of Cuenca (1597–1600), Bishop of Córdoba (1594–1597), and Bishop of Calahorra y La Calzada (1589–1594).

Biography
Pedro Portocarrero was born in Spain.
On 20 March 1589, he was appointed during the papacy of Pope Sixtus V as Bishop of Calahorra y La Calzada.
On 4 June 1589, he was consecrated bishop by Gaspar de Quiroga y Vela, Archbishop of Toledo, with Sebastián Pérez (bishop), Bishop of Osma, and Diego de la Calzada, Titular Bishop of Salona, serving as co-consecrators.
On 12 January 1594, he was appointed during the papacy of Pope Clement VIII as Bishop of Córdoba.
On 28 May 1597, he was appointed during the papacy of Pope Clement VIII as Bishop of Cuenca.
He served as Bishop of Cuenca until his death on 20 September 1600.

While bishop, he was the principal consecrator of Pedro Manso Zuñiga, Bishop of Calahorra y La Calzada (1594); and Francisco Reinoso Baeza, Bishop of Córdoba (1597).

References

External links and additional sources
 (for Chronology of Bishops)
 (for Chronology of Bishops)
 (for Chronology of Bishops) 
 (for Chronology of Bishops) 
 (for Chronology of Bishops) 
 (for Chronology of Bishops)

Further reading 
Juan Antonio Llorente. Historia crítica de la Inquisición de España: Obra original conforme á lo que resulta de los archivos del Real Consejo de la Suprema, y de los tribunales del Santo-oficio de las provincias. Publicado por en la Imprenta del Censor, (1822) Digitized by Google 12 Sep 2007'.

16th-century Roman Catholic bishops in Spain
17th-century Roman Catholic bishops in Spain
Bishops appointed by Pope Sixtus V
Bishops appointed by Pope Clement VIII
1600 deaths